Corcoran Woods, also known as Corcoran Environmental Study Area, or the Corcoran Tract, is a woodland preserve located in the northwest section of Sandy Point State Park in Annapolis, Maryland.

References

Annapolis, Maryland
Landforms of Anne Arundel County, Maryland
Nature reserves in Maryland
Forests of Maryland
Protected areas of Anne Arundel County, Maryland